Planinc is a surname. Notable people with the surname include:

Albin Planinc (1944–2008), Slovenian chess player
Milka Planinc (1924–2010), Yugoslav politician
Štefan Planinc (1925–2017), Slovene painter and illustrator

Slovene-language surnames